The Essex Alliance Football League is an English football league for clubs based in Essex and north-eastern Greater London. The league has six divisions (Senior, Premier, Divisions One, Two, Three and Four), of which the Senior Division sits at 11th level in the English football league system, formerly Step 7 in the National League System, following the Football Association's approval to become a Regional NLS Feeder League (Step 7) from season 2021–22 onwards. Teams that finish in the top five of the league can apply for promotion to the Division One South of the Eastern Counties Football League (Step 6), subject to their facilities meeting criteria and other conditions.

History
The league was founded in 2014 through the merging of the Ilford and District and the Essex Business House football leagues, which both shared a common aim to support and promote local grassroots football in Essex and East London while bridging the gap with other neighbouring leagues in the region. The league permits member clubs to play on grounds in the boroughs of Havering, Barking & Dagenham, Redbridge, Newham, Waltham Forest, Harlow and Epping Forest.

The league currently has a membership of 76 teams, many of whom were existing members of the aforementioned leagues and were joined by many new clubs as the league seeks to buck the trend of the local Saturday football scene which had been diminishing in numbers over the past few years.

In 2022, history was made in the league as the first direct promotion to senior football was confirmed with DT FC, champions of the Senior Division, successfully promoted to Step 6 within the Eastern Counties Football League Division One South.

During the 2022/23 season, it was announced by the Football Association that four leagues in England would pilot the first ever referee body worn camera trial, the Essex Alliance League one of those chosen to take part for a period of 18-24 months, alongside leagues in Middlesbrough, Liverpool and Worcestershire.

Member clubs for 2022–23

Champions

References

External links
Official website

Football leagues in England
Sports leagues established in 2014
2014 establishments in England
Football competitions in London
Football in Essex